Klaus Klotz (born 9 January 1976) is a German lightweight rower. He won a gold medal at the 1996 World Rowing Championships in Motherwell with the lightweight men's eight.

References

1976 births
Living people
German male rowers
World Rowing Championships medalists for Germany